Kjell "Schou'en" Schou-Andreassen (19 June 1940 – 19 November 1997) was a Norwegian footballer and one of the country's most successful football managers.  He is best known as manager of the Norway national football team 1974-1977, together with Nils Arne Eggen.

Although he played midfield for Viking FK (1958–59, 1964–70, 202  games), he also played for Stavanger IF (1960–61) and Sportsklubben Brann (1962–63) when they won Norwegian First Division 1963.  He played one U19 game (1958).

He coached Viking FK as assistant of Sverre Andersen (1971), and as head coach (1972), which won the club the Norwegian First Division 1972.

He was national U21 team manager (1973–77) and main manager with Nils Arne Eggen (1974–78). In 1977, Norway came close to qualifying for a finals for the first time since the war. The pair also took charge for the Olympics in 1987. After his time as national manager, Schou-Andreassen was coach of Bryne FK (1977–79) and Lillestrøm Sportsklubb where he took over from Joe Hooley and finished 2nd in the Norwegian Football Cup 1980 and won the Norwegian Football Cup 1981. Later, he went "home" to Viking and won the Norwegian First Division 1982.

Eggen said that Schou Andreassen was the man who best represented Norwegian football for him.  For 15 years, Schou-Andreassen managed at the top-level of Norwegian football. He had a great deal of influence over Norwegian coaching and sport. He later built his own personnel department. Schou-Andreasen died of leukemia, aged only 57.

Bibliography
Ledelse, teamarbeid og teamutvikling i fotball og arbeidsliv Together with Cato Wadel. 1989

References

1940 births
1997 deaths
Sportspeople from Stavanger
Norwegian footballers
Norwegian football managers
Viking FK players
Stavanger IF players
SK Brann players
Viking FK managers
Norway national football team managers
Bryne FK managers
Lillestrøm SK managers
Association football midfielders